The "gay bomb" and "halitosis bomb" are informal names for two non-lethal psychochemical weapons that a United States Air Force research laboratory speculated about producing. The theories involve discharging sex pheromones over enemy forces in order to make them sexually attracted to each other.

In 1994 the Wright Laboratory in Ohio, a predecessor to today's United States Air Force Research Laboratory, produced a three-page proposal on a variety of possible nonlethal chemical weapons, which was later obtained by the Sunshine Project through a Freedom of Information Act request.

Background
No well-controlled scientific studies have ever been published suggesting the possibility of pheromones causing rapid behavioral changes in humans.

Some body spray advertisers claim that their products contain human sexual pheromones which act as an aphrodisiac. In the 1970s, "copulins" were patented as products which release human pheromones, based on research on rhesus monkeys. Subsequently, androstenone, axillary sweat, and "vomodors" have been claimed to act as human pheromones.

Despite these claims, no pheromonal substance has ever been demonstrated to directly influence human behavior in a peer reviewed study.

Using a brain imaging technique, Swedish researchers have shown that when homosexual and heterosexual males are presented with two odors that may be involved in sexual arousal their brains tend to respond differently, and that the homosexual men tend to respond in the same way as heterosexual women, though it could not be determined whether this was cause or effect. The study was expanded to include homosexual women; the results were consistent with previous findings meaning that homosexual women were not as responsive to male identified odors, while their response to female cues was similar to that of heterosexual males. According to the researchers, this research suggests a possible role for human pheromones in the biological basis of sexual orientation.

Leaked documents
In both of the documents, the possibility was canvassed that a strong aphrodisiac could be dropped on enemy troops, ideally one which would also cause "homosexual behavior". The documents described the aphrodisiac weapon as "distasteful but completely non-lethal".

Body odors 
Body odor remote-engineering, involving compounds found in halitosis and hyperhidrosis, was another possibility discussed. Again, these effects would be produced by a non-lethal chemical weapon—possibly one that would affect the hormonal and digestive systems. It appears that a 'heavy sweating bomb', 'flatulence bomb' and 'halitosis bomb' were also considered by a committee at the time. The plan was to make an enemy so smelly they could be quite literally sniffed out of hiding by their opponents.

Ig Nobel Prize awards 
Wright Laboratory won the satiric 2007 Ig Nobel Peace Prize for "instigating research & development on a chemical weapon—the so-called 'gay bomb' / 'poof bomb'—that will make enemy soldiers become sexually irresistible to each other."

See also 
 Bremelanotide, the only known synthetic aphrodisiac
 Frey effect (science)
 Misattribution of arousal
 30 Rock, a sitcom which featured a working gay bomb in the episode "Cooter".
 Brickleberry, a sitcom whose sixth episode, "Gay Bomb", involves a gay bomb.
 The Alex Jones Show, a conspiracy theory outlet, talks about how Atrazine runoff is the equivalent of a gay bomb by causing the endocrine system of amphibians to alter their gender.

Notes

References

External links 
 
US military planned 'gay bomb'
Air force looked at spray to turn enemy gay
Air Force Considered Gay 'Love Bomb' Against Enemies
US Military "Gay Bomb" Video (Republican National Convention blog)

Chemical weapons
Non-lethal weapons
Pheromones
Sexual orientation
Psychological warfare
Fictional weapons